Highway 221 (AR 221, Ark. 221, and Hwy. 221) is a north–south state highway in Carroll County, Arkansas. The route begins at the McIlroy Wildlife Management Area and runs north through Berryville to Missouri Route 39 at the Missouri state line. Created in 1957, the route has remained unchanged since 1967. The route is maintained by the Arkansas State Highway and Transportation Department (AHTD).

Route description
Highway 221 begins at the Madison−Carroll County line in the Ozark Mountains. A county road continues south from this terminus into the McIlroy Wildlife Management Area under the Arkansas Game and Fish Commission administration. The state highway travels northeast through the hills and woods southwest of Berryville before entering the Berryville city limits. In Berryville, it travels north as Huntsville Street before turning onto Carl Street and intersecting US Highway 62 (US 62) just south of the Berryville town square. Highway 221 follows US 62 south to an intersection with Highway 21, where Highway 21/Highway 221 turn north together as Springfield Street.

Unusual for an Arkansas state highway, the concurrency of AR 21 and AR 221 is well signed though no signage is provided for northbound travelers to remain on northbound AR 221 once it reaches US 62. The two routes travel together to the north edge of Berryville, when Highway 221 splits north toward the Missouri state line. Highway 221 winds through rural areas toward the state line, where the roadway continues as Route 39 towards Springfield.

History
The route was created by the Arkansas State Highway Commission between Highway 21 and the Missouri state line on July 10, 1957. It was extended south on November 23, 1966, between US 62 in Berryville and the Madison county line. However, the extension was not correct, and the Commission clarified the intended extension on January 25, 1967, with the incorrect mileage being returned to the county highway system.

Major intersections

See also

References

External links

221
Transportation in Carroll County, Arkansas